Riccardo Giovanelli (August 30, 1946 – December 14, 2022) was an Italian-born American astronomer. He was an emeritus professor of astronomy at Cornell University in Ithaca, New York, United States.

Background
Born at Praticello, in central Italy, Giovanelli spent his childhood years in western Argentina (in Mendoza and Tucuman) but returned with his family to Italy when he was ready to enter university. He studied physics first at the University of Parma and graduated with his laurea cum laude in physics from the University of Bologna in 1969. His parents were partisans during World War II.

After graduation, Giovanelli entered the graduate program at Indiana University, in the United States, as a Fulbright fellow and received his PhD in astronomy in 1976. He undertook his PhD research as a graduate student in residence at the National Radio Astronomy Observatory in Charlottesville, Virginia in 1972 and 1973. From 1974 to 1976, he served as a civil volunteer teaching physics at the National University of El Salvador, in substitution of his Italian military service. Upon completion of his PhD, he joined the staff of the Arecibo Observatory of the National Astronomy and Ionosphere Center in Puerto Rico, eventually serving as head of the radio astronomy group as well as observatory site director.

In 1991, Giovanelli joined the faculty at Cornell University as professor of astronomy. He was an expert in observational cosmology, galaxy evolution and the application of radio spectroscopy for studies of large scale structure and galaxy evolution. He was a driving force behind the development of the Cerro Chajnantor Atacama Telescope project of which he served as a director. He was a principal scientist on the ALFALFA survey at Arecibo. He was also a strong proponent in support of science in developing countries in South America.

He was married to astronomer Martha Haynes.

Awards
In 1989 Giovanelli and Martha Haynes were awarded the Henry Draper Medal from the National Academy of Sciences for their work on mapping the local universe.

References

External links
Riccardo Giovanelli, Cornell University
ALFALFA: The Arecibo Legacy Fast ALFA Survey. Team members

1946 births
2022 deaths
20th-century Italian astronomers
20th-century American astronomers
University of Parma alumni
University of Bologna alumni
Indiana University alumni
Cornell University faculty
People from the Province of Reggio Emilia